Graham Haskell (born 30 August 1948) is an Australian former athlete of the 1970s.

Born in England, Haskell competed as a sprinter and previously held the national record in the 100 metres at 10.1 seconds. He was a two-time national 100 metres champion. At the 1974 British Commonwealth Games in Christchurch he was a member of the gold medal-winning 4x100 metres relay team (with Laurie D'Arcy, Greg Lewis and Andrew Ratcliffe). He also made both the 100 m and 200 m individual finals, finishing eighth and fourth respectively.

Haskell now lives in Tasmania and is a contemporary artist.

References

External links
Graham Haskell at World Athletics

1948 births
Living people
Australian male sprinters
Commonwealth Games medallists in athletics
Commonwealth Games gold medallists for Australia
Athletes (track and field) at the 1974 British Commonwealth Games
English emigrants to Australia
Medallists at the 1974 British Commonwealth Games